Curiosa is a 2019 French biographical film directed by Lou Jeunet starring Noémie Merlant, Niels Schneider and Benjamin Lavernhe. It is loosely based on the relationship between 19th-century French authors Pierre Louÿs and Marie de Régnier. Pierre Louÿs was an erotomaniac who took erotic or pornographic photographs of his mistresses.  Such erotic or even pornographic representations are referred to as 'curiosa'’, hence the name of the movie.

Plot
The film recounts the relationship between Marie de Régnier (1875–1963) and Pierre Louÿs (1870–1925), which takes place in France around the turn of the 20th century. Pierre Louÿs and his friend Henri de Regnier both fall in love with Marie, daughter of the poet José-Maria de Heredia. Marie is a respected writer who signed her first book, ‘’L'Inconstante’’, under the pseudonym Gérard d'Houville. Although she loves Pierre, she marries the wealthy Henri to help pay off her father's debt and to improve her social position.

Pierre subsequently flees to Algeria where he meets Zohar, a beguiling woman with whom he starts a passionate relationship. When he returns to France, he takes Zohar with him. Marie becomes his mistress and she and Zohar both engage in erotic games with Pierre and pose nude for him.  They discover themselves by transgressing the norms of the bourgeois society they live in. Marie starts to invent stories to inflame Pierre’s erotic imagination. With these stories she gains power over him and discovers her sexuality and literary voice. When Pierre goes back on a trip, Marie feels a terrible emptiness and discovers she is pregnant.

Critical reception
The film received mixed reviews, with Allociné noting an average rating by professional film reviewers of 2.9/5.

Première found some positive points despite an average rating: "We won't complain about this desire for images and beauty that is cruelly lacking in French cinema". Le Monde was a little more severe: "…the film does not really problematize the question of the image, for which it substitutes a somewhat adulterated sensualism".

References

External links

 
 

2019 films
French historical drama films
French biographical drama films
French erotic drama films
2010s French-language films
Films set in Paris
Films set in the 1800s
2010s French films